Robert, Rob, Bob or Bobby Craig may refer to:

Sportspeople
Bob Craig (Scottish footballer) (1886–1918), Scottish footballer
Bob Craig (rugby) (1881–1935), Australian rugby player and Olympic gold medalist
Bobby Craig (footballer, born 1935) (1935–2010), Scottish footballer
Bobby Craig (footballer, born 1928) (1928–2016), English footballer
Bobby Craig (Australian footballer) (1882–?), Australian rules footballer

Academics
Robert T. Craig (born 1947), communication scholar
Robert C. Craig (1921–1990), academic who taught at the Michigan State University
Robert Craig (theologian) (1917–1995), academic and church leader
Robert Meldrum Craig (1882–1956), geologist and academic author

Others
Robert Craig (representative) (1792–1852), U.S. Representative from Virginia
Robert Hunter Craig (1829–1913), British Member of Parliament for Glasgow Govan, 1900–1906
Robert Craig (Medal of Honor) (1919–1943), Scottish-born U.S. Army officer awarded the Medal of Honor for his  service on Sicily

See also 
Craig (surname)